Dwayne Samuel Hosey (born March 11, 1967) is an American former professional outfielder for the Boston Red Sox of the Major League Baseball (MLB). He threw right-handed, and was a switch hitter.

Career
Hosey was drafted by the Chicago White Sox in 1987 Major League Baseball draft, and spent most of his career in the minor league organizations of the Oakland Athletics, Milwaukee Brewers, Kansas City Royals, and Boston Red Sox.  In 1994 he had his best minor league season, winning the American Association MVP.  In 112 games hit .333 and slugging .628 with 27 home runs, 80 RBI, 27 stolen bases, and 95 runs scored.

He was traded to the Texas Rangers in 1996, but was released without playing in a major league game with the Rangers.

Hosey worked hard to get used to Japanese pitching, and his work paid off in his first season, where he beat out Hideki Matsui to lead the Central League with 38 home runs. He was released during the 1998 off-season.

Currently, Dwayne Hosey is the owner of Hosey Baseball Training Center in Omaha, Nebraska. Mr. Hosey became well familiar with Omaha as a member of the Omaha Royals. His son, Bronson, plays centerfield for the Omaha Westside Warriors and looks to continue his baseball career.

External links

1967 births
Living people
American Association (1902–1997) MVP Award winners
American expatriate baseball players in Canada
American expatriate baseball players in Japan
Baseball players from Pennsylvania
Boston Red Sox players
Bridgeport Bluefish players
Edmonton Trappers players
Gulf Coast White Sox players
Huntsville Stars players
Las Vegas Stars (baseball) players
Madison Muskies players
Major League Baseball outfielders
Modesto A's players
Nippon Professional Baseball outfielders
Omaha Royals players
Ottawa Lynx players
Pawtucket Red Sox players
People from Sharon, Pennsylvania
Utica Blue Sox players
South Bend White Sox players
Stockton Ports players
Wichita Wranglers players
Winnipeg Goldeyes players
Yakult Swallows players